Nathaniel Hughson (16 July 1755, New York1 November 1837, Hamilton, Ontario) was a farmer and hotel owner, a Loyalist who moved to Canada following the American Revolution, and one of the city founders of Hamilton, Ontario. Married to Rebecca Land who was the daughter of Robert Land and Phoebe Scott, both United Empire Loyalists.

Hughson was among 10,000 Loyalists who moved to New Brunswick in 1783, following the American revolution, eventually moving to Upper Canada where present day Hamilton is. Hughson's land extended from Main Street to the Bay, between present day James Street and Mary Street. He was a farmer and also started up a newspaper called the Upper Canada Phoenix, in Dundas, Ontario. Also an original stock holder of the Gore Bank in 1836.

Tribute
Hughson Street in the city of Hamilton, Ontario is named after him. Other streets in the city were named after his family members: James, Rebecca and Catharine. Married to Rebecca Land.

References

External links
  (Hughson mentioned in Durand's Bio.)
  (Hughson mentioned in Hamilton's Bio.)

1755 births
1837 deaths
American emigrants to pre-Confederation New Brunswick
History of Hamilton, Ontario
Canadian city founders
United Empire Loyalists
Pre-Confederation Canadian businesspeople
Businesspeople from New York City